Herminium monorchis, the musk orchid, is a commonly occurring species of orchid. It is widespread across much of Europe and northern Asia from France to Japan, including China, Siberia, Mongolia, Ukraine, Germany, Italy, Scandinavia, etc.

It has a localised distribution in Britain; sites where it is found include Ham Hill in Wiltshire  and Noar Hill in Hampshire.

References

External links
First Nature Herminium monorchis - Musk Orchid
Rogier van Vugt, Flora of the Netherlands,  Herminium monorchis 
Online Atlas of the British and Irish Flora
Tela Botanica, Orchis musc, Herminium monorchis (L.) R.Br.
AHO Bayern, Kleine Einknolle, Honigorchis, Elfenständel, Herminium monorchis 
Botany Czech,  toříček jednohlízný / trčuľa jednohľuzá, Herminium monorchis

monorchis
Orchids of Europe
Orchids of Asia
Plants described in 1753
Taxa named by Carl Linnaeus